In control theory, a Kalman decomposition provides a mathematical means to convert a representation of any linear time-invariant (LTI) control system to a form in which the system can be decomposed into a standard form which makes clear the observable and controllable components of the system. This decomposition results in the system being presented with a more illuminating structure, making it easier to draw conclusions on the system's reachable and observable subspaces.

Definition 
Consider the continuous-time LTI control system

 ,
 ,

or the discrete-time LTI control system  
 ,
 .

The Kalman decomposition is defined as the realization of this system obtained by transforming the original matrices as follows:

 ,
 ,
 ,
 ,

where  is the coordinate transformation matrix defined as

 ,

and whose submatrices  are 
  : a matrix whose columns span the subspace of states which are both reachable and unobservable.
  : chosen so that  is invertible.
It can be observed that some of these matrices may have dimension zero. For example, if the system is both observable and controllable, then , making the other matrices zero dimension.

Consequences
By using results from controllability and observability, it can be shown that the transformed system  has matrices in the following form:

 

 

 

 

This leads to the conclusion that
 The subsystem  is both reachable and observable.
 The subsystem  is reachable.
 The subsystem  is observable.

Variants 
A Kalman decomposition also exists for linear dynamical quantum systems. Unlike classical dynamical systems, the coordinate transformation used in this variant requires to be in a specific class of transformations due to the physical laws of quantum mechanics.

See also
 Realization (systems)
Observability
 Controllability

References

External links
Lectures on Dynamic Systems and Control, Lecture 25 - Mohammed Dahleh, Munther Dahleh, George Verghese — MIT OpenCourseWare

Control theory